Pelivan is a commune in Moldova. Pelivan may also refer to
Pelivan, Belgrade, a pastry shop in Belgrade, Serbia
Dominik Pelivan (born 1996), German-Croatian football midfielder
Ion Pelivan
Jure Pelivan (1928–2014), Bosnian Croat politician and economist